Aristolochia gigantea, the Brazilian Dutchman's pipe or giant pelican flower (syn. Aristolochia sylvicola Standl.), is an ornamental plant native to Brazil. Typical of subtropical Bahia and Minas Gerais vegetation, it is a vigorous evergreen climber (vine) with heart-shaped leaves and spectacular fragrant flowers. This plant is cited in Flora Brasiliensis by Carl Friedrich Philipp von Martius. A. gigantea and other tropical Dutchman's pipe varieties pose a threat to the pipevine swallowtail  butterfly. The butterfly confuses A. gigantea with its native host plant and will lay eggs on it although pipevine swallowtail caterpillars cannot survive on the foliage.

In cultivation in the UK - where it must be grown under glass - this plant has gained the Royal Horticultural Society’s Award of Garden Merit. It does not tolerate temperatures below . It can be grown from seeds or cuttings.

References

External links

Aristolochia gigantea photo
 Aristolochia gigantea
 Aristolochia gigantea
 Flora Brasiliensis: Aristolochia gigantea

gigantea
Flora of Brazil